Undersaturation is a state of a solution that contains less of a dissolved material than could be dissolved by that quantity of solvent under normal circumstances. It can also refer to a vapor of a compound that has a lower (partial) pressure than the compound's vapor pressure. Undersaturation is often followed by ingassing of the solvate until saturation is reached.  Most states of solution involve undersaturation.

See also
Supersaturation

References

Solutions